Goldene Europa award is the oldest German Television award  for artists and entertainers. It was awarded from 1968 to 2003. In the years 1989 and 2001, there were no ceremonies. Since 1981, the gala was broadcast on television.

The original sculpture award for the "Goldene Europa" from 1968 is the work of sculptor Herbert Strässer.

The award was originally designed with the aim of launching the careers of German artists and producers with their music facing strong competition from the United States and United Kingdom. Therefore, in the early years only German-language hits were awarded. From 1979, the leadership decided to allow foreign artists to win the Goldene Europa reward. In later years, the Goldene Europa was also awarded in other areas such as comedy, entertainment, politics, sports or drama.

Award Winners 
,

1968 desde Wiesbaden 
 Alexandra
 Roy Black
 Rex Gildo
 Udo Jürgens
 Vicky Leandros
1969 desde Wiesbaden
 Peter Alexander
 Christian Anders
 Katja Ebstein
 Heintje
 James Last
 Petra Pascal
 Reiner Schöne
1970
 Roy Black
 Cindy & Bert
 Michael Holm
 Peter Maffay
 Chris Roberts
 Marianne Rosenberg
1971
 Roy Black
 Daniela
 Les Humphries Singers
 Peter Maffay
 Martin Mann
 Reinhard Mey
 Chris Roberts
1972
 Can
 Heino
 Inga und Wolf
 Freddy Quinn
 Tony Marshall
 Juliane Werding
 Wolfgang
1973
 Christian Anders
 Cindy & Bert
 Bernd Clüver
 Heino
 Joana
 Knut Kiesewetter
 James Krüss
 Vicky Leandros
 Loriot 
 
 Jürgen Marcus
 Reinhard Mey
 Monica Morell
1974
 Peter Alexander
 Cindy & Bert
 Bernd Clüver
 Gunter Gabriel
 Elfi Graf
 Hana Hegerová
 Heino
 Mireille Mathieu
 Nina & Mike
1975
 Cindy & Bert
 Costa Cordalis
 Gitte
 Michael Holm
 Heidi Kabel
 Chris Roberts
 Rentnerband
 Margot Werner
 Frank Zander
1976
 Cindy & Bert
 Udo Jürgens  Ein ehrenwertes Haus
 Michael Kunze
 Mireille Mathieu
 Ingrid Peters
1977
 Leonard Bernstein
 Boney M.
 Frank Farian
 Heino
 Udo Jürgens
 Ricky King
1978
 Gilbert Bécaud
 Howard Carpendale
 Jürgen Drews
 Udo Jürgens
 Udo Lindenberg
 Nana Mouskouri
 Bonnie Tyler
1979
 Adamo
 Stig Anderson
 Jean Marc Cerrone
 Jürgen Drews
 Frank Farian
 Jean-Philippe Iliesco
 Manfred Krug
 Bruce Low
 Mireille Mathieu
 Vader Abraham
1980
 Peter Alexander
 Angelo Branduardi
 The Buggles
 Dschinghis Khan
 Peter Maffay
 Sally Oldfield
 Thom Pace
1981
 Boney M.
 Tony Christie
 Dalida
 Katja Ebstein
 Udo Jürgens
 Robert Palmer
 Helen Schneider
 Caterina Valente
 Stefan Waggershausen
1982
 Albano Carrisi & Romina Power
 Rudi Carrell
 Falco
 Ideal 
 Roland Kaiser
 Peter Maffay
 Nicole
 Shakin' Stevens
 Spider Murphy Gang
 Trio
 Joachim Witt
1983
 Alfred Biolek
 Culture Club
 Geier Sturzflug
 Peter Hofmann
 Udo Jürgens
 Mireille Mathieu
 Nicki 
 Friedrich Nowottny
 Sydne Rome
 Peter Schilling
 Taco
 Bonnie Tyler
1984
 Alphaville
 Howard Carpendale
 Elke Heidenreich
 Peter Maffay
 Ulla Meinecke
 Nena
 Isabel Varell
 Peter Weck
 Jack White
1985
 Benny Andersson, Björn Ulvaeus , Tim Rice,  musical Chess
 Karlheinz Böhm
 Harold Faltermeyer
 Headline
 Udo Jürgens
 Klaus Lage
 Modern Talking
 Alison Moyet
 Opus
 Hans Rosenthal
 Jennifer Rush
 Purple Schulz
 Scorpions
1986
 Falco
 Joachim Fuchsberger
 Karat
 Peter Maffay
 Münchener Freiheit
 Chris Norman
 Sandra
 Jeff Thomas, singer formerly with Duran Duran
 Working Week
1987
 Alice
 Howard Carpendale
 Julien Clerc
 Hob Goblin
 Ute Lemper
 Mary & Gordy
 Mike Oldfield
1988
 a-ha
 France Gall
 Peter Maffay
 Guesch Patti
 Pur
 Chris Rea
 Umberto Tozzi
 Vienna Symphonic Orchestra Project
1990
 
 David Hasselhoff
 Harald Juhnke
 Patricia Kaas
 Harald Kloser 
 Udo Lindenberg
 Giorgio Moroder
 Gianna Nannini
 Roxette
 Tina Turner
1991
 Edoardo Bennato
 Erste Allgemeine Verunsicherung
 Hape Kerkeling
 Marx Rootschilt Tillermann
 Orchestral Manoeuvres in the Dark
 Rod Stewart
 UB40
 Caterina Valente
 Stefan Waggershausen
 Viktor Lazlo
1992
 Michael Cretu
 Sandra
 Genesis
 Hans-Dietrich Genscher
 Gipsy Kings
 Barbara Hendricks
 Jean Michel Jarre
 Nigel Kennedy
 Johnny Logan
 Scorpions
 Peter Ustinov
 Peter Weck
 Eric Woolfson
1993, 
 Dieter Bohlen
 Bonnie Tyler
 Justus Frantz
 Haddaway
 Maurice Jarre
 Anna Maria Kaufmann
 Leslie Mandoki 
 Al Martino
 Die Prinzen
 Harald Schmidt
1994 Budapest (Hungría)
 All-4-One
 Montserrat Caballé
 Erasure
 Thomas Gottschalk
 Gyula Horn
 Joshua Kadison
 Lucilectric
 Reinhard Mey
 Sinéad O’Connor
 Cliff Richard
 2 Unlimited
1995 Bozen
 Andrea Bocelli
 Chris de Burgh
 Luca Carboni
 Edwyn Collins
 The Connells
 Die Doofen
 The Kelly Family
 La Bouche
 Miss Saigon
 Pur
 Scatman John
 Zucchero
1996
Innsbruck
 Bryan Adams
 BAP
 Shirley Bassey
 DJ Bobo
 Flic Flac
 Fool's Garden
 Les Misérables
 Schürzenjäger
 Die Sendung mit der Maus
 Spice Girls
 S.T.S.
1997
 Bee Gees
 Bellini
 Gerd Dudenhöffer
 Klaus Hoffmann
 The Kelly Family
 Vanessa Mae
 No Mercy
 Bernhard Paul
 André Rieu
 Rolf Zuckowski
1998
 4 the Cause
 Bell Book & Candle
 Boyzone
 Dieter Thomas Heck
 Udo Jürgens 
 James Last
 Peter Maffay  
 Michael Mittermeier
 Mike Oldfield 
 Modern Talking
1999
 Lou Bega
 Joe Cocker
 Helmut Lotti
 Geri Halliwell
 Rüdiger Hoffmann
 Oli.P
 Drew Sarich 
 Sasha
 Simply Red
 Günter Wewel
 Erik Zabel
2000
 a-ha 
 Anastacia 
 ATC 
 Ayman  SR 1 Europawelle
 Franz Beckenbauer 
 Iris Berben 
 Andrea Bocelli,
 DJ Ötzi, 
 Echt, 
 Bryan Ferry 
 Hans Klok,
 Udo Lindenberg 
 Frank Nimsgern
 2002
 Jeanette Biedermann 
 Bro’Sis
 Sarah Connor 
 DoRo
 Josh Groban 
 Patricia Kaas 
 Michael Kunze 
 Reinhard Mey 
 Nicole
 Uwe Seeler 
 Shakira 
 Jutta Speidel
 Fritz Wepper
2003  Bremen 
 Paul Kuhn
 Puhdys 
 Otto Waalkes

References

German television awards